was a village located in Yoshida District, Fukui Prefecture, Japan.

As of 2003, the village had an estimated population of 3,492 and a density of 137.75 persons per km². The total area was 25.35 km².

On February 13, 2006, Kamishihi, along with the town of Matsuoka (also from Yoshida District), was merged into the expanded town of Eiheiji.

Dissolved municipalities of Fukui Prefecture
Eiheiji, Fukui